The Circle Is Round is the sixth studio album by American alternative rock/pop punk band Magnapop.

Reception
For Clash, Will Fitzpatrick gave the album seven out of 10. The editorial staff of AllMusic Guide gave the release 3.5 out of five stars, with reviewer Heather Phares, writing that the band sounds as good as ever and of this music, "all of this looking back never feels too bogged down by nostalgia, even when they revisit their earliest days".

Track listing
All songs written by Linda Hopper and Ruthie Morris
"Dog on the Door" – 3:18
"Change Your Hair" – 2:44
"A Simple Plan" – 3:28
"Super Size Me" – 3:05
"Need to Change" – 2:11
"What Can I Do" – 2:51
"Rain Rain" – 3:38
"Disabled" – 3:52
"Rip the Wreck" – 2:53
"Leo" (Demo) – 3:00
"Pretty Awful" (Demo) – 2:26

Personnel
Magnapop
Linda Hopper – vocals
David McNair – drums
Ruthie Morris – guitar, vocals
Shannon Mulvaney – bass guitar, vocals

Additional personnel
Ed Burdell – guitars, production
Vyvyan Hughes – photography
Bruce King – keyboards
Henry Owings – design
Jeffrey Shipman – photography

References

2019 albums
Happy Happy Birthday to Me Records albums
Magnapop albums